Samuel's Fortress may refer to:

 Samuel's Fortress, Ohrid, in North Macedonia
 Samuel's Fortress, Klyuch, in Bulgaria
 the village of Samuilova Krepost, Petrich municipality, Blagoevgrad Province, Bulgaria